Osredak may refer to several places:

Bosnia and Herzegovina 

Osredak, Doboj, Republika Srpska
Osredak (Gornji Vakuf)
Osredak, Krupa na Uni, Republika Srpska
Osredak, Srebrenica, Republika Srpska
Osredak, Cazin, Federation
Osredak, Zenica, Federation
Osredak, Vareš, Federation
Osredak, Gornji Vakuf-Uskoplje, Federation

Serbia 

Osredak Special Nature Reserve, protected area in central Serbia

See also
Osredci (disambiguation)